The Bayagoula were a Native American tribe from what is now called Mississippi and Louisiana in the southern United States. Due to transcription errors amongst cartographers who mistakenly rewrote the tribe's name as  their name is erroneously assumed to translate as "bayou people"; further corruptions of the tribe's name into the two-word  led most later 19th and 20th century cartographers to mistakenly assume the annotation referred not to a tribe but to a bayou near present day Donaldsonville, Louisiana named after some tribe known simply as the "Goula", or to the name of a settlement named after that nonexistent bayou.  The Bayagoula were a part of the peoples who spoke Muskogean languages.

The Houma people were recorded as attacking them around 1699–1700. They lived with another tribe, the Mougoulacha, in 1700. In the early 18th-century the Bayagoula killed many Mougoulacha, almost exterminating the entire tribe. This was triggered by a fight between the two tribes' chiefs.

The Tonica tribe moved into the community soon thereafter. In 1706 the Tonica ambushed the Bayagoula and almost killed all of them. By 1721, the rest of the tribe had suffered many deaths from smallpox, a new infectious disease carried by the French and other Europeans, among whom it was endemic. The remaining Bayagoula are believed to have moved to the area of the present-day Ascension Parish of Louisiana. Some likely joined nearby villages of the Houma and Acolapissa who lived in the area, whilst others likely intermarried with neighbouring French, Spanish, and German colonists.

References

Further reading 
Fredlund, Glen G. Where Did the Bayogoula Dance, why Do They Sing No More: A Reexamination of the Archaeology of the Bayou Goula Area, Iberville Parish, Louisiana. Baton Rouge: Louisiana State University (1983).
Reeves, William D. From Tally-Ho to Forest Home: The History of Two Louisiana Plantations. P. 10-14. .

Native American tribes
Native American tribes in Mississippi
Native American tribes in Louisiana
Ascension Parish, Louisiana